Douglas Quinta Reis (February 24, 1954 - October 13, 2017) was a Brazilian editor and publisher, known for popularizing RPGs and comic books in Brazil.

Career 
In 1987, Quinta Reis met Mauro Martinez dos Prazeres while working at Unisys, an IT services company. In 1987, the pair founded Devir Livraria in São Paulo, along with Walder Mitsiharu Yano and Martinez's wife, Deborah Fink.

Devir was initially an importer of RPG (role-playing games) fantasy books, and comics aimed at adults, connecting a Brazilian audience with the North American comics market. The comics include titles from Marvel, DC, Image, Dark Horse, and other independent publishers. Devir later became a publishing house, being one of the most important Brazilian publishers of RPG and card games, with subsidiaries in Portugal, Spain, Chile, and other Latin American countries. 

In 1990, Devir began translating and publishing RPG books in Portuguese. In 1995, the company began importing Magic: the Gathering, a strategy game. Devir imported other popular RPGs, including Dungeons & Dragons and GURPS.  

In 2000, Devir brought the Pokémon Trading Card Game to Brazil.

Personal life 
On October 13, 2017, Quinta Reis died of a heart attack at the age of 65.

In 2017, Quinta Reis won, in memoriam, the Troféu HQ Mix in the "Great Homage" category. National RPG Day was created in Brazil in 2017 and celebrated on Quinta Reis' birthday, February 24.

References 

Comic book publishers (people)
Comic book editors

1954 births
2017 deaths